Anarchy is the state of a society being freely constituted without authorities or a governing body.

Anarchy may also refer to:

General 
 Anarchism, the belief that the state and all forms of rulership are undesirable and should be abolished
 Anarchy in international relations, posits that there is no universal sovereign or worldwide government
 Lawlessness, the feared result of anarchism

Historical periods 
 Anarchy at Samarra, period of civil war and fragmentation in the Abbasid Caliphate (861–870)
 Anarchy of the 12 Warlords, period of civil war in Vietnam (944–968)
 Military Anarchy, period of civil war and military coups in the Roman Empire (235–284)
 The Anarchy, the period of civil war and unsettled government in England during the reign (1135–1154) of King Stephen
 Twenty Years' Anarchy, the period of extreme instability and several short-lived emperors in the Byzantine Empire (695–717)

Comics 
 Anarchy Comics, a series of underground comics published between 1978 and 1987
 Anarchy, the fifth trade paperback volume of the Powers comic book series, published by Image Comics

Films 
 Cymbeline (film), or Anarchy, a 2014 film based on Shakespeare's Cymbeline
 Anarchy (1989 film), a Soviet drama film

Music 
 Anarchy (Busta Rhymes album), 2000
 Anarchy (Chumbawamba album), 1994
 Anarchy (Neon Hitch album), 2016
 Anarchy (Shiritsu Ebisu Chugaku album), 2016
 "Anarchy" (song), a 1997 song by KMFDM

Other arts and media 
 Anarchy (video game), a 1990 shooter video game
 Anarchy Online, a 2001 science fiction MMORPG game
 The Anarchy (book), a book on the East India Company by William Dalrymple
 Anarchy (book) (L'anarchia), Errico Malatesta's 1891 pamphlet explaining his version of anarchism
 Anarchy (magazine), a London anarchist magazine from the 1960s
 Anarchy: A Journal of Desire Armed, a North American anarchist magazine

See also 
 
 
 Anarchist (disambiguation)
 Anarchism (disambiguation)
 Anarky (disambiguation)
 Anomie, a social condition characterized by an absence or diminution of standards or values
 Chaos (disambiguation), unpredictability, the antithetical concept of cosmos